Indian Squash Academy (also known as ICL-TNSRA Squash Academy) is a squash training facility established by the Squash Racquets Federation of India (SRFI) in Chennai, India. The India Cements was one of the sponsors it had initially sponsored the 1990 facility along with the Tamil Nadu Squash Racquets Association (TNSRA). It has trained several squash players such as Saurav Ghosal, Joshna Chinapa, Dipika Pallikal and Manish Chotrani.

History 
The academy was established as a joint venture between India Cements, SRFI, TNSRA and Sports Development Authority of Tamil Nadu in 2000. N. Ramachandran who was an industrialist and the president of TNSRA is said to be the one behind its creation. Initially, the facility had three courts from ASB Germany which was later accompanied by five additional ones.

The facility has hosted the 2007 Men's World Team Squash Championships. It has hosted the Asian Junior Squash Individual Championships on five occasions in 1997, 2001, 2005, 2009 and 2018.

Facilities 
The academy has eight squash courts in total. It consists of two complexes; one with 3 glass back rainbow courts and the other with 4 glass back rainbow courts that are convertible to 2 doubles courts. The ASB 4-sided glass court, enables television coverage from all angles, has a seating capacity of 500. All courts have been imported from ASB Germany. The overall seating capacity of the facility is 1,000. The academy also has a dormitory and cafeteria.

Notable players 
The academy has trained numerous players who have achieved in the international level.

 Saurav Ghosal
 Joshna Chinappa
 Gaurav Nandrajog
 Parthiban, Ramit Tandon
 Naresh Kumar
 W. Anwesha Reddy
 Cyril Kuhn
 Karan Malik
 Lakshmi Shruti Settipalli
 Harinder Pal Singh Sandhu
 Dipika Pallikal
 Parth Sharma
Ravi Dixit

S.Maniam, a coach from Malaysia, who was the Consultant coach of Squash Rackets Association heads the training panel of the academy. Cyrus Poncha, India's National squash coach also coaches at the facility.

References

External links
 Junior Nationals Draw
 Newspaper Interview with N. Ramachandran, SRFI

Squash in India
Sport schools in India
Sport in Chennai
cs:Squash
da:Squash
de:Squash
et:Squash
es:Squash
fr:Squash
id:Squash
it:Squash
he:סקווש
ms:Skuasy
nl:Squash
ja:スカッシュ (スポーツ)
no:Squash (sport)
pl:Squash
fi:Squash
sv:Squash (sport)
zh:壁球